Lucas Vorsterman II, Lucas Vorsterman the Younger or Lucas Vorsterman Junior (1624 – between 1666 and 1676) was a Flemish Baroque engraver and draughtsman. He produced engravings after the work of the leading painters of the next generation and for the various book projects of the Antwerp publishers.

Life
Lucas Vorsterman the Younger was born in Antwerp. He was the son of Lucas Vorsterman I who worked as an engraver with leading Flemish artists Peter Paul Rubens and Anthony van Dyck.   He trained under his father and became a master of the Antwerp Guild of Saint Luke in 1651/2.

He is believed to have died in Antwerp between 1666 and 1676.

Work

Lucas Vorsterman the Younger made many engravings after Rubens, van Dyck, Jacob Jordaens and Cornelius Schut.  He worked on various publication projects of Antwerp publishers.

He worked with Gaspar Bouttats on engravings after drawings by Jan Peeters I for the publication by Jacob Peeters in Antwerp of several sets of prints issued under the title   This was a series of maps and views of locations in Southern Europe, Northern Africa and the Middle East.<ref>[http://hdl.handle.net/10934/RM0001.COLLECT.192483 Print from the 'Description des principales villes] at the Rijksmuseum</ref>

Lucas Vorsterman the Younger also made many reproductive engravings for David Teniers the Younger’s illustrated catalogue of the Italian pictures in the  collection of Archduke Leopold Wilhelm of Austria.  The publication entitled Theatrum pictorium'' was published in Antwerp in  1658.

The Scottish National Gallery in Edinburgh holds a drawing by his hand.

The works of Lucas Vorsterman II are regarded as lacking skilled draughtsmanship and to be mechanical in their execution.

References

External links
 
 Engravings by Lucas Vorsterman at the British Museum website

1624 births
Flemish engravers
Painters from Antwerp
Year of death unknown